Paul Pesch is a male former international table tennis player from Romania.

He won a bronze medal at the 1956 World Table Tennis Championships in the Swaythling Cup (men's team event) with Toma Reiter, Matei Gantner, Tiberiu Harasztosi and Mircea Popescu for Romania.

See also
 List of table tennis players
 List of World Table Tennis Championships medalists

References

Romanian male table tennis players
World Table Tennis Championships medalists